Marcia Shines is the debut studio album as a solo artist for American-Australian singer Marcia Hines. Hines had been resident in Australia since 1970. Marcia Shines was released in October 1975, and peaked at number 4 in January 1976.
Marcia Shines was the biggest selling album by an Australian female artist in 1975. In November 1976, Hines was given a platinum award for this album. It was the highest selling album by an Australian female artist at the time.

Track listing
LP/Cassette

Charts

Weekly charts

Year-end charts

Certifications

See also
 List of Top 25 albums for 1976 in Australia

References

Marcia Hines albums
1975 debut albums